Onustus caribaeus is a species of large sea snail, a marine gastropod mollusk in the family Xenophoridae, the carrier shells.

Description
The anatomy of O. Caribaeus. is very similar to all members of the Xenophoridae family. Their shells have a flat bottom and a short conical spiral on top. They are known for their ability to camouflage by attaching substrates like pebbles, sand, empty shells, and even coral to the top of their shells. The specifics of how this is done are not known. However, we know that these foreign objects are fused to the shells in all different conformations, radially, laterally, or symmetrically as the shell grows. The shells can reach a maximum height of 45 mm, in average 37 mm. The diameter of the base reaches a maximum length of 88 mm, in average 60 mm. The colour of the dorsum is yellowish-white. Like other snails, O. Caribaeus have a radula, used for scraping detritus and other substances off of substrates to feed on, and a muscular foot used for locomotion.

Distribution
Onustus caribaeus is distributed in the North-eastern Gulf of Mexico, the Caribbean Sea and along the Atlantic coast of Brazil between 35m and 640m (mostly deeper than 100m).

References

 Onustus caribaeus (Petit de la Saussaye, 1857). WoRMS (2010). Onustus caribaeus (Petit de la Saussaye, 1857). Accessed through: World Register of Marine Species at http://www.marinespecies.org/aphia.php?p=taxdetails&id=468051 on 9 July 2010 .
 J. E. MORTON, THE ADAPTATIONS AND RELATIONSHIPS OF THE XENOPHORIDAE (MESOGASTROPODA), Journal of Molluscan Studies, Volume 33, Issue 3, December 1958, Pages 89–101, https://doi.org/10.1093/oxfordjournals.mollus.a064812 
 A. G. Beu (1977) New Zealand Cenozoic Gastropods of the genus Xenophora Fischer, 1807, Journal of the Royal Society of New Zealand, 7:2, 229-241, DOI: 10.1080/03036758.1977.10427161
 Crippa, Pasinetti, G., & Dapiaggi, M. (2020). How did the carrier shell Xenophora crispa (König, 1825) build its shell? Evidence from the Recent and fossil record. Lethaia, 53(4), 439–451. https://doi.org/10.1111/let.12367 
 Feinstein, & Cairns, S. D. (1998). Learning from the collector: A survey of azooxanthellate corals affixed by Xenophora (Gastropoda: Xenophoridae), with an analysis and discussion of attachment patterns. The Nautilus (Philadelphia).
 Kreipl, K. & Alf, A. (1999): Recent Xenophoridae. 148 pp. incl. 28 color plts. ConchBooks, Hackenheim, ISBN 3-925919-26-0 
 Arquivos de zoologia. (1967). Museu de Zoologia da Universidade de São Paulo.

External links

Xenophoridae
Gastropods described in 1857